Kyagalanyi Coffee Limited is a private company in Uganda, involved in coffee procurement, processing and export.

Overview
Kyagalanyi is a leading coffee procurement, processing and marketing company in Uganda. In 2009, the company exported over 510,000 bags of coffee, each weighing 60 kg. This represented approximately 16% of all the country's coffee export that year, totaling 3.2 million bags. The coffee was sold primarily the European Union, Japan, Australia and South Sudan. The company also markets directly to the major international coffee roasting companies.

When Uganda's coffee crop was nearly decimated by the coffee wilt disease in the  1990s and early 2000s, Kyagalanyi played a major role in re-seeding with wilt-resistant varieties of Robusta coffee. At the company's  facility in Nakanyonyi Village, Mukono District, Kyagalanyi established a nursery with these new varieties and supplied them to farmers at no cost. The company has its main processing plant in Kampala's Industrial Area and another processing factory in Mbale, that is dedicated to processing Arabica coffee, that is grown in the mountainous region around Mount Elgon.

History
The company was founded in the 1990s when the coffee sector was liberalized by the Ugandan Government.

See also

References

External links
 Profile of Farmer Schemes Belonging to Kyagalanyi Coffee Limited, Uganda

Food and drink companies of Uganda
Coffee companies
Kampala Central Division
Coffee in Uganda
Agriculture companies of Uganda